The 1972-73 NBA season was the Rockets' 6th season in the NBA and 2nd season in the city of Houston.

Offseason

Draft picks

Roster

Regular season

Season standings

Record vs. opponents

Game log

Notes

References

Houston
Houston Rockets seasons